Broken Island is an island  long, lying  north of Centre Island in the north part of Square Bay, off the west coast of Graham Land. Discovered and named by the British Graham Land Expedition (BGLE) under Rymill, 1934–37.

See also 
 List of antarctic and sub-antarctic islands

References

Islands of Antarctica